Bungowannah is a locality in the Riverina region of New South Wales, Australia.

Bungowannah Post Office opened on 1 December 1867, was closed between 1906 and 1918, and finally closed in 1951.

References

External links

Towns in the Riverina
Towns in New South Wales